Colegio del Salvador is a private Catholic, pre-school, primary, and secondary school for boys, located in Buenos Aires, Argentina. The school was founded by the Society of Jesus in 1868.

Notable alumni

 Natalio R. Botanapolitical scientist and historian
 Carlos Octavio Bungesociologist, writer and lawyer
 Oscar Camiliónpolitician, lawyer and diplomat; served as Minister of Defense from December 1993 to August 1996
 Ivo Cutzaridaactor, politician, and director of films and soap operas
 Enrique Finochiettoa distinguished Argentine academic, physician, and inventor
 Joaquin Galansinger, actor, composer and producer. Also known for being part of the famous duo Pimpinela
 Manuel Gálveznovelist, poet, essayist, historian and biographer
 Julio Grondonafootball executive who served as the president of the Argentine Football Association and as a Senior Vice-president of FIFA
 Juan José Llacheconomist and sociologist. Professor and researcher of Universidad Austral. Member of the Pontifical Academy of Social Sciences since 1994 and of the national academies of Education since 2003 and Economics since 2007. He also served as the Secretary of Economic Policy between December 1991 and August 1996 and as the Minister of Education from December 1999 to October 2000
 Felix Lunaprominent writer, lyricist, and historian
 Francisco Diego Macielretired football player
 Salvador Oríalawyer who focused his career on economics; served as the Minister of Public Works during Ramón Castillo presidency
 Alejandro Posadasphysician and surgeon specializing in pediatric surgery. He was the first person to film an operation. He brought the first x-ray machine to Argentina
 Julio César Saguierlawyer and politician; former Mayor of Buenos Aires

Notable faculty

 Pope Francisas Jorge Mario Bergoglio, taught literature and psychology and in served as spiritual director and confessor
 Ismael Quilesa Spanish philosopher and Jesuit priest who was the main promoter of East Asian studies in Argentina; founded the School of Oriental Studies at Universidad del Salvador
 Guillermo FurlongJesuit priest and historian; Member of the National Academy of History of Argentina

See also

 Catholic Church in Argentina
 Education in Argentina
 List of Jesuit schools

References  

Jesuit secondary schools in Argentina
Schools in Buenos Aires
Educational institutions established in 1868
1868 establishments in Argentina
Jesuit primary schools in Argentina
Boys' schools in Argentina